Tobias Pellegrini (born 3 April 1996) is an Austrian footballer who plays for SK Vorwärts Steyr.

Career

FC Wels
Ahead of the 2019/20 season, Pellegrini joined FC Wels in the Austrian Regionalliga.

References

External links

Austrian footballers
Association football forwards
LASK players
FC Blau-Weiß Linz players
2. Liga (Austria) players
Austrian Regionalliga players
Footballers from Linz
1996 births
Living people